Norway–Poland relations are the diplomatic relations between the Kingdom of Norway and the Republic of Poland. Both nations enjoy friendly relations, the importance of which centers on mutual historical relations and the fact that more than 100,000 Polish citizens live in Norway on a permanent basis, Poles make up 2.10% of the Norwegian population. Both nations are members of the Council of Europe, Council of the Baltic Sea States, NATO, OECD, OSCE, United Nations and the World Trade Organization.

History

The first contact between Norway and Poland took place in the Middle Ages with Vikings (Norsemen) from Scandinavia sailing up the Vistula river in Poland. The Vikings also founded and settled in Jomsborg in Pomerania and became known as Jomsvikings. Official contact between both nations began in the 10th century when Polish Princess Świętosława (daughter of Mieszko I of Poland) married King Sweyn Forkbeard of Denmark and Norway. From their union, their son Cnut the Great would continue to rule Norway and the North Sea Empire. In the medieval period, Poland and Norway entered into alliances several times, incl. in 1315 and 1419. During the Hanseatic League, trade and cultural contacts developed between Polish cities on the Baltic Sea, mainly Gdańsk; and Bergen in Norway, where Polish ships reached with grain.

In the 17th century, during the Swedish Deluge, Polish troops led by Stefan Czarniecki fought together with soldiers from Denmark–Norway against the Swedish invasion in Poland and during the Dano-Swedish War. By the late 18th century, the third and final partition of Poland had occurred and Poland lost its independence for the next 123 years.

In 1918, after World War I, Poland regained its independence, and both nations established diplomatic relations in 1919. However, political and governmental contacts were few in the interwar period, and economic cooperation and trade remained low. In 1931 Poland signed the Svalbard Treaty, which recognizes the sovereignty of Norway over the archipelago of Svalbard in the Arctic Ocean, and grants signatories equal rights to engage in commercial activities and scientific research on the archipelago.

During World War II, both countries were invaded by Germany. The Polish Independent Highland Brigade fought for Norway in the Battles of Narvik against German soldiers. During the war, both countries maintained close contacts as both had governments-in-exile based in London. Approximately 20,000 Poles were taken by the Germans from occupied Poland for forced labor in Norway, while some Norwegian prisoners of war were sent to German POW camps operated in occupied Poland (most notably Oflag XXI-C). After liberation, Norway became a second home for some of the former Polish forced laborers. Shortly after the end of World War II, Poland and Norway resumed diplomatic relations in 1945. In 1974, Norway's Prime Minister Trygve Bratteli paid an official visit to Poland.

During the Polish Solidarity movement; the Polish Trade Unions received support from Poles living in Norway, political emigrants, Norwegian politicians and trade unionists. The official visits of King Harald V of Norway to Poland in 1993 and the President of Poland, Lech Wałęsa, to Norway in March 1995; were an expression of the will of both countries to give their mutual relations the highest rank.

Modern relations

Since Poland's accession to NATO in March 1999, Polish-Norwegian relations have become allied and bilateral political and military cooperation have strengthened between both nations. In 2012, King Harald V of Norway paid a second visit to Poland and in 2016, Polish President Andrzej Duda paid a state visit to Norway.

Poland is one of Norway's ten main trading partners. In 2019, Poland was the seventh largest source of imports and the tenth largest export destination for Norway.

The Baltic Pipe, connecting Norway via Denmark to Poland, is scheduled to be completed in October 2022. Its purpose is to ensure natural gas supplies from Norway to Poland.

Several Polish polar stations are located in the Norwegian archipelago of Svalbard.

Bilateral agreements
Both nations have signed a few agreements such a trade and shipping agreement (1926); conciliation and arbitration treaty (1929); tariff arrangement (1935); customs agreement (1937); trade and payment agreement (1946) and a trade agreement (1964). With Norway being a member of the European Free Trade Association and Poland being a member of the European Union; most bilateral relations between both nations are conducted through those two organizations.

Resident diplomatic missions
 Norway has an embassy in Warsaw
 Poland has an embassy in Oslo.

Honorary consulates
There are honorary consulates of Norway in Gdynia, Kraków, Szczecin and Wrocław, and honorary consulates of Poland in Ålesund, Stavanger and Trondheim.

See also 
 Foreign relations of Norway 
 Foreign relations of Poland
 Embassy of Poland in Oslo
 Baltic Pipe
 Poles in Norway
 Polish Independent Highland Brigade
 Norway–EU relations
 European Union–NATO relations

References 

 
Poland
Norway